Bissett may refer to:

 Bissett, Manitoba, a community in Canada
 Bissett (surname), people with the surname Bissett
 Clan Bissett, a Scottish clan
 Bissett family (Ireland), a branch of the Scottish clan that settled in Ireland

See also
 Bisset